Timo Järvinen (born 18 November 1966) is a Finnish speed skater. He competed at the 1988 Winter Olympics and the 1992 Winter Olympics.

References

External links
 

1966 births
Living people
Finnish male speed skaters
Olympic speed skaters of Finland
Speed skaters at the 1988 Winter Olympics
Speed skaters at the 1992 Winter Olympics
Sportspeople from Helsinki